WTHN is a radio station licensed to Sault Ste. Marie, Michigan broadcasting on 102.3 FM.  WTHN airs a format consisting of Christian contemporary music and Christian talk and teaching as an affiliate of The Promise FM, and is owned by Northern Christian Radio, Inc.

References

External links 
WTHN's website

Contemporary Christian radio stations in the United States
THN
Radio stations established in 2005
2005 establishments in Michigan
THN